John Lee Smith (born February 14, 1976), known by his stage name Big Smo, is an American country rap musician, singer, songwriter, producer, and film director. After several independent and minor label releases, Smo's major label debut studio album, Kuntry Livin', was released in 2014 and charted on three Billboard charts. He was the subject of an eponymous reality television series on A&E that began in 2014.

Early life
John Lee Smith was born in San Diego, California, to mother Mary Jane Smith (née Barber) and father Carl Avery Smith. His father, who was a veteran of the U.S. Navy, died in 2007. His mother is his business manager.  Big Smo graduated from Shelbyville Central High School

Music career
Smith started his musical endeavors in 1999, but did not release an album for three years. He released Kuntry Kitchen with Yayoda Records in 2002. Then, he released another album with Yayoda in 2007 entitled The True South. His last self-released album was 2018's Special Reserve In 2010, his homemade music video "Kickin' It in Tennessee" went viral, garnering over five million views on YouTube. He released two EPs with Warner Bros. Records that were 2012's Grass Roots and 2013's Backwoods Whiskey. Smith's major-label debut came out in 2014, entitled Kuntry Livin'.

Musical style
According to Matt Bjorke of Roughstock, Big Smo is one of the foremost grassroots artists in a style known as rural rap or hick-hop, "which blends rural, Country themes and melodies with some rap elements (production and vocal delivery)". AllMusic's Steve Legget commented that Big Smo "combines country themes and attitudes with rap and hip-hop in a style that prompted one reviewer to note 'If Kid Rock and Run–D.M.C. had a love child, he would be named Big Smo,' although combining Hank Williams Jr. with Nappy Roots might strike a bit closer." Rolling Stone described Big Smo as sounding like "If Run–D.M.C.'s 'Walk This Way' stomped out of Queens and ended up in the rural south." The music on Kuntry Livin''' was described as spinning "rap rhymes about working-class values over hard-rock riffs."

Other media
Smith was the principal subject of an eponymously titled television series, Big Smo. The program, about his life and music by A&E, debuted in June 2014. He appeared in one episode, "Empty Bottles Full Cans", of the Spike TV series Bar Rescue.

His life is featured in episode one, "Kuntry Livin", of CarbonTV's original series Heartlandia'', showing him shooting guns, cooking, and making music.

Personal life
Smith lives on his  family farm compound known as, the "Kuntry Ranch", located in Unionville, Tennessee, a part of the Shelbyville, Tennessee Micropolitan Statistical Area.

Discography

Studio albums

Extended plays

Singles

Other charting songs

Music videos

References

External links
 

1976 births
American country singer-songwriters
American male singer-songwriters
Country rap musicians
People from Shelbyville, Tennessee
Elektra Records artists
Warner Records artists
Living people
Rappers from San Diego
Rappers from Tennessee
Singer-songwriters from California
Country musicians from California
Singer-songwriters from Tennessee
Country musicians from Tennessee
21st-century American rappers
21st-century American male musicians